Badminton is a village and civil parish in Gloucestershire, England. It consists of Great Badminton and Little Badminton.

History
In 1612 Edward Somerset, 4th Earl of Worcester, bought from Nicholas Boteler his manors of Great and Little Badminton, called Madmintune in the Domesday Book while one century earlier the name Badimyncgtun was recorded, held by that family since 1275.

Badminton House
The village houses the Duke of Beaufort's residence, Badminton House, which has been the principal seat of the Somerset family since the late 17th century. Badminton House also gives its name to the sport of badminton.

Amenities
The village has a small shop which also serves as a post office.

Transport
The village is located close to the A46 and A433, the B4040 passes south of it. The next motorway junction is Tormarton Interchange between A46 and M4.
The former railway station in nearby Acton Turville closed in 1968, but the line is still active. The nearest railway station is Yate on the Bristol–Gloucester line.
West of the village is Badminton Airfield.

Horse trials
The village is famous for its horse trials, which take place in early May each year in the grounds of Badminton House.

St Michael and All Angels
The parish church of St Michael and All Angels in Great Badminton is attached to the Duke of Beaufort's residence. The current church was built in 1785 and serves as the principal burial place of the Somerset family. Nearly all Dukes and Duchesses are interred here. A smaller church, also dedicated to St Michael and All Angels, stands in neighbouring Little Badminton.

Little Badminton
To the north of the main village is the small rural settlement of Little Badminton. Here can be found farm houses, cottages and estate lodges very much in the traditional Cotswold style of architecture. Remains of a medieval 'sunken village' can be seen in Little Badminton, as well as an ornamental dovecote or croft, which is mentioned in the Domesday book.

Notable events
Field Marshal FitzRoy James Henry Somerset, 1st Baron Raglan, aide-de-camp to the Duke of Wellington in the Peninsular War and later commander of all the British forces in the Crimean War was born, raised and buried in Badminton. He was the youngest son of the 5th Duke of Beaufort.

The village of Badminton played host to the Dowager Queen Mary during the Second World War, who was evacuated from Marlborough House in London to take up residence at Badminton House for the duration of the war. She lived here with her niece Mary, Duchess of Beaufort, wife of the 10th Duke.

Badminton Golf Club (now defunct) was founded in the late 1890s or early 1900s. The club closed in 1914.

References

External links
 
 

Villages in South Gloucestershire District
Civil parishes in Gloucestershire